{{DISPLAYTITLE:C40H80NO8P}}
The molecular formula C40H80NO8P (molar mass: 734.03 g/mol) may refer to:

 Colfosceril palmitate
 Dipalmitoylphosphatidylcholine (DPPC)

Molecular formulas